"The Millennium" is the 154th episode of the NBC sitcom Seinfeld. It was the 20th episode of the eighth season and aired on May 1, 1997. In this episode, Kramer and Newman plan rival millennium parties, George tries to get fired in the most spectacular manner possible, and Jerry ends up in a three-way struggle with his girlfriend and his girlfriend's stepmother over what numbers they appear at on each other's speed dial.

Plot
The New York Mets management asks George to leave the New York Yankees and become their head scout. He decides to leave in a blaze of glory with a dramatic firing, but his efforts only end up making him look better. He wears Babe Ruth's uniform and gets food stains on it, but Mr. Steinbrenner praises him, thinking it shows an "out with the old, in with the new" mentality. George runs through Yankee Stadium during a game, wearing a flesh-colored body suit, that wins the enthusiasm of fans. He destroys a Yankees' World Series trophy by hitching it to his car and driving through the parking lot while screaming insults with a megaphone. This finally brings the ire of Steinbrenner, but Mr. Wilhelm takes the blame for ordering the destruction of the trophy, gets fired and takes the job with the Mets.

Elaine tries to run an ethnic-themed clothes store called Putumayo out of business after receiving bad customer service. She tries shopping at a competing store, Cinco de Mayo, but discovers that the same woman owns both stores. She tells Kramer to change all the price tags to 99 cents, but he accidentally breaks the pricing gun before he can finish. Instead, he takes the desiccant packs from the clothes, eats some chips the store gives out to customers, and unknowingly drops one of the desiccant packs in the salsa.

Kramer and Newman are planning rival millennium parties. Newman's party is called "Newmannium". Fearing all his friends will go to Newmannium, Kramer accepts an offer to co-host Newmannium instead, under the condition that they do not invite Jerry. However, moved by loyalty to Jerry, Kramer resurrects his own party and gets Elaine to come. Newman lets Jerry come to Newmannium in exchange for Elaine's presence. Jerry points out to Newman that since he booked Newmannium for the Millennium new year, the hotel would have scheduled it on December 31, 2000 due to there being no year zero, while millennium celebrations are held almost universally on December 31, 1999, making Newman's party a year late.

After a subpar date, Jerry notices his girlfriend, Valerie, has moved his number from number 7 to 9 on her speed dial. He takes her on an extravagant date to get his speed dial "ranking" boosted up to 1. Her domineering stepmom demands Jerry surrender the number 1 spot. When Valerie hears of this, she takes her stepmom off speed dial altogether. Her stepmom instigates trouble by putting Jerry on her speed dial. Valerie has Jerry negotiate to get himself off her stepmom's speed dial in exchange for Valerie putting her back on her speed dial, but the stepmom only concedes to hiding Jerry's number in her emergency speed dials. Later, she's poisoned by eating the desiccant-contaminated salsa. When Valerie calls poison control, Jerry answers. Valerie is disgusted at this and hangs up.

Production
The table read for the episode was held on March 5, 1997, and filming took place on March 11.

The fans cavorting with the bodysuit-clad George were played by Seinfeld writers Steve Koren, Gregg Kavet, Andy Robin, and Spike Feresten. Cut material from the episode included a callback to "The Comeback": When George is talking about getting fired, Kramer asks "Is Steinbrenner married?", prompting George to angrily shoot back "I'm not saying I had sex with his wife!" The scenes with Jerry and Valerie’s mother parody The Graduate.

References

External links

Seinfeld (season 8) episodes
1997 American television episodes
New Year television episodes
Fiction set in 1999
Fiction featuring the turn of the third millennium